The Battle of Cerro del Gallo was a small engagement fought in 1927 between federal Mexican forces and a band of Yaquis at Cerro del Gallo. This was one of the last major battles of the Yaqui Wars.

Battle 
On April 28, 1927, Mexican newspaper, El Universal, reported that Yaquis had withdrawn from mountains near Cerra del Gallo. In response, Mexico decided to conduct a major offensive against them. Operations would be directed by general Álvaro Obregón, assisted by the general Francisco Manzo. Thus leading towards the battle and the capture of 415 Yaquis. following the Yaquis defeat, Mexico had establish garrison on Yaqui pueblos and villages. With the newly formed Mexican Air Force, Mexico had bombed and gas Yaqui positions on mountains. On October 2, 1927, Manzo had expected Luis Matius, the Yaqui chieftain, to surrender after holding onto the Bacatete Mountains for a year.

See also 

 Mexican Air Force
 Battle of Bear Valley
 Yaqui Uprising

Reference 

History of Mexico
Nogales 1913
Battles involving the Yaqui
1920 in Mexico
Yaqui Wars
Yaqui tribe
April 1927 events
Conflicts in 1927